Chinguil is a sub-prefecture of Guéra Region in Chad.

Demographics 
Ethnic composition by canton in 2016:

Daguela Canton (population: 22,000; villages: 65):

Sorki Canton (population: 6,000; villages: 38):

References 

Populated places in Chad